Bauhinia may refer to:

 Bauhinia, a genus of flowering plants
 Bauhinia, Queensland, a town in Australia
 Bauhinia Garden, a public housing estate in Tseung Kwan O, Hong Kong
 Shire of Bauhinia, a former local government area in Queensland, Australia
 BAUHINIA, Callsign of Hong Kong Airlines